179th meridian may refer to:

179th meridian east, a line of longitude east of the Greenwich Meridian
179th meridian west, a line of longitude west of the Greenwich Meridian